Pettway may refer to:

Deborah Pettway Young (1916–1997), an American textile artist 
Jerry Pettway, an American basketball player
 Jessie T. Pettway, an American textile artist 
Ken Pettway (born 1964), American player of gridiron football
Kenny Pettway, an American football player
Vincent Pettway, an American boxer